Granulifusus benjamini is a species of sea snail, a marine gastropod mollusk in the family Fasciolariidae, the spindle snails, the tulip snails and their allies.

Description
The length of the shell attains 21.6 mm.

Distribution
This species occurs in the Coral Sea.

References

benjamini
Gastropods described in 2005